The 54th World Rowing Junior Championships took place from 11 to 15 August 2021   in Plovdiv, Bulgaria.

Results

Men

Women

Medal table

References

External links
WorldRowing website

2021
International sports competitions hosted by Bulgaria
Rowing competitions in Bulgaria
Junior
World Rowing Junior Championships
World Rowing Junior Championships